Tokai Radio Broadcasting. Company Limited (東海ラジオ放送株式会社) is a Japanese radio broadcasting company serving the areas of Aichi Prefecture, Gifu Prefecture, and Mie Prefecture, owned by the Chunichi Shimbun Group.

Network 
 NRN (National Radio Network)

Stations

Aichi Prefecture 
 Nagoya JOSF 1332 kHz 50 kW(STEREO→MONORAL); 92.9 MHz (FM)
 Toyohashi JOSM 864 kHz 100 W
 Shinshiro 1332 kHz 100 W

Gifu Prefecture 
 Ena 801 kHz 100 W
 Hidakamioka 1458 kHz 100 W
 Takayama JOSN 1485 kHz 100 W
 Gero JOTM 1485 kHz 100 W

Mie Prefecture 
 Igaueno 1557 kHz 100 W
 Owase 1062 kHz 100 W
 Kumano 1485 kHz 100 W

Programs 
 Mid-Night TOKAI(end)
 Kanitaku ITTAMONGACHI
 Mami RADI cal Communication(end)
 Kazuo Zaitu JINSEIGAME-21(end)
 Guts Nighter(NighterSeason)
etc...

See also
 Tokai Television Broadcasting

External links
 Tokai website

Radio in Japan
Mass media in Nagoya